Banali (बनाळी) is a serene and holy village located in the Jath taluka of Sangli District in Maharashtra, India. Situated 10 km north of Jath via Achakanhalli, the village is known for its beautiful temple dedicated to Goddess Shri Banshankari, also known as Shakambhari, where visitors can seek blessings and tranquility. The village is unique as all of its residents are strictly vegetarian, and the land of Banali is considered holy due to the presence of the goddess. The temple is surrounded by a dense forest, providing a peaceful and secluded atmosphere for devotees to worship in. The village celebrates the 8th day of Navratri with great enthusiasm, holding a Jatra (fair) on this day. Banali is a place of spirituality, natural beauty, and cultural significance, attracting visitors from all over the region.

How to reach Banali ?

Nearest International Airport :

Mumbai {446 km}

Nearest Domestic Airport:

Kolhapur{144 km}

Pune{284 km}

Main Railway station (CR):

Miraj junction {93 km}

Bijapur {76 km}

Sangli (city)-{96 km}

Jath Road (Walekhindi)-{17 km}

Central Bus Station :Jat {12 km}

Nearest Villages ?

Antaral {2 km},Shegaon {5 km},Achaknhalli {5.5 km},watal{5 km}.

population:

The Banali village has population of 3212 of which 1655 are males while 1557 are females as per population census 2011.

Literacy:

In 2011, literacy rate of Banali village was 71.86% compared to 82.32% of maharashtra.

Workers:

Total workers in Banali 1746

949 are males and remaining 797 are females.

Area:

Total geographical area is 2254.00 Hectares.

External links
 Jath taluka
 Jath State in British India

Villages in Sangli district